The 2014 Albanian Cup Final was a football match played on 18 May 2014 to decide the winner of the 2013–14 Albanian Cup, the 62nd edition of Albania's primary football cup.

The match was between Flamurtari and Kukësi at the Qemal Stafa Stadium in Tiranë.

Flamurtari Vlorë won the final 1–0 for their fourth Albanian Cup title.

Match

Details

References

Cup Final
2014
Albanian Cup
Sports competitions in Tirana
Albanian Cup Final, 2014
Albanian Cup Final, 2014